Miss Venezuela 2020 was the 67th edition of the Miss Venezuela pageant. It was held on September 24, 2020 at the Estudio 1 de Venevisión in Caracas. There were two pageants during one night: Miss Venezuela World 2020 and Miss Venezuela 2020. Isabella Rodríguez, Miss Venezuela 2018, who represented Venezuela during Miss World 2019 crowned Alejandra Conde of Aragua as the winner at the final of Miss Venezuela World 2020 and she represented Venezuela at Miss World 2021 where she placed Top 40. Thalía Olvino, Miss Venezuela 2019 of Delta Amacuro crowned Mariángel Villasmil of Zulia as her successor at the end of the event.

Isbel Parra was also crowned as Miss International Venezuela 2020 by Melissa Jiménez, Miss International Venezuela 2019, who represented Venezuela during Miss International 2019. Villasmil represented Venezuela at Miss Universe 2020.

On July 2, 2021 Luiseth Materán one of Top 5 was appointed as Miss Universe Venezuela 2021. She also represented Venezuela at Miss Universe 2021 where she placed Top 16.

Results 
Color key

Miss Venezuela World
The Miss Venezuela World was held as a separate competition. The winner represented Venezuela at Miss World 2021

Miss Universe Venezuela 2021
The Miss Universe Venezuela 2021 was appointed by the organization who represented Venezuela at Miss Universe 2021.

Interactive Beauty Gala
The following awards were given by fan vote on the official website and Twitter.

Judges

The judges for the final telecast include:

Antonio Delli – Actor and announcer
Guillermo Felizola - Photographer 
Irene Esser – Miss Venezuela 2011
Laura Viera – Journalist and entertainer
Leudo González – Administrador and President of Consejo Superior de Turismo de Venezuela (Conseturismo)
Natalia Moretti – Actress and entertainer
Patricia Valladares – Lawyer and President of Alianza Venezolana de Empresas por el Liderazgo de las Mujeres (AVEM)
Shairi Arredondo – Image consultant and sustainable fashion designer
Wilmer Machado – Actor and singer

Contestants 
Contestants from 20 states, the Guayana Region, and the Capital District competed for the title.

References

External links
Miss Venezuela Official Website

Miss Venezuela
2020 beauty pageants
2020 in Venezuela
September 2020 events in Venezuela